The following is a list of episodes and seasons of the animated television series Chaotic.

Series overview

Episodes

Season 1 (2006–08)

Season 2: M'arrillian Invasion (2008–09)

Season 3: Secrets of the Lost City (2009–10)

External links
 Chaotic Game Site

Episodes
Lists of American children's animated television series episodes
Lists of Canadian children's animated television series episodes